Alamosa may stand for:
 Alamosa, Colorado
 Alamosa County, Colorado
 Alamosa River
 Alamosa National Wildlife Refuge
 
 Alamosa springsnail